The Long Walk (Lao: ບໍ່ມີວັນຈາກ) is a 2019 Laotian drama film directed by Mattie Do. It premiered in the Giornate degli Autori section of the 76th Venice International Film Festival. It also screened in the Contemporary World Cinema section at the 2019 Toronto International Film Festival.

Cast
 Yannawoutthi Chanthalungsy as The Old Man
 Vilouna Phetmany as Lina
 Por Silatsa as The Boy
 Noutnapha Soydara as The Girl
 Chanthamone Inoudome as The Mother
 Brandon Hashimoto as Kenji

References

External links
 

2019 films
2019 drama films
Laotian films
Lao-language films
Films directed by Mattie Do